Arbeiter Zeitung (German: "Workers' Newspaper") was the daily of the Social Democrat Party and published in Austria. It existed between 1889 and 1991.

History and profile
Arbeiter Zeitung was started on 12 July 1889 by the Socialist Party and Victor Adler. The paper was banned in 1934 after the 13 February issue, but reappeared on 4 August 1945 as the main organ of the Austrian Social Democrat Party, continuing until 1989, providing general coverage of Austrian and international news. From 1985 through 1989 it was published under the title Neue AZ; from 1989 to 1991 it was published as AZ. From 1989 until 1991 it was published as an independent newspaper, and ceased publication in 1991.

In the 1920s the circulation of the daily reached 100,000 copies. The paper reduced its circulation by one quarter from 1960 to 1990.

Among its noted contributors and editors in the pre-war period was its cultural editor David Josef Bach. Ernst Fischer served as the editor of the paper.

See also
List of newspapers in Austria

References

External links
Online archive, 1945-1989

1889 establishments in Austria
1991 disestablishments in Austria
Defunct newspapers published in Austria
Daily newspapers published in Austria
German-language newspapers published in Austria
Newspapers established in 1889
Publications disestablished in 1991
Socialist newspapers
Social Democratic Party of Austria